State Trunk Highway 160 (often called Highway 160, STH-160 or WIS 160) is a state highway in the US state of Wisconsin. It runs in east–west in east-central Wisconsin from Angelica to Pulaski.

Route description
Starting at WIS 29/WIS 55 junction in Angelica, WIS 160 travels eastward. After under , WIS 160 ends at WIS 32 in Pulaski.

History
Initially, in 1923, WIS 160 was established to bypass WIS 16 from Mill Center to Angelica through downtown Pulaski. In 1930, four years after WIS 16 was renumbered WIS 29, both WIS 29 and WIS 160 switched places. However, WIS 160 ended up traveling from WIS 29 in Angelica to WIS 32 in Pulaski. In 1996, the route was slightly truncated in favor of the WIS 29 expressway.

Major intersections

See also

References

External links

160
Transportation in Shawano County, Wisconsin
Transportation in Brown County, Wisconsin